Tony Pond  (23 November 1945 – 7 February 2002) was a British rally driver.

Career
His first outings in a rally car were on the then regular (in the early '60s) Saturday night road rallies in the home counties around London, driving a Mini Cooper S. Using the same car he also became successful at auto-testing – the practice of manoeuvering the car against the clock around a series of cones. 

He then prepared a Lotus Cortina for an attempt on the Lombard RAC Round Britain Rally, and was running in the top twenty when a visit to a ditch in icy conditions put an end to the outing. 

At this time Ford had launched the Mexico Rally Championship, and Pond persuaded the local Ford dealer in his home town, Norman Reeves of Uxbridge, to prepare and supply a car for the Championship. He finished second overall, the reward for which was a drive in a works supported Escort RS1600 on the Scottish International Rally. He finished in the top ten, which was enough incentive for Norman Reeves to prepare and supply him with an ex-factory Escort RS1600 for a season.

Using this car he was a regular top ten finisher in the British Rally Championship, competing against and beating the likes of Jimmy McRae (Colin's father) and Russell Brookes, culminating in a third place on the Welsh International Rally in 1973, beating Tony Fall into fourth place. At this time Fall was competitions manager for the Dealer Opel Team (DOT), and the offer of a works supported drive was not long in coming. 

Unfortunately, although DOT and Pond were successful with the 2 litre Opel Kadett, General Motors had taken the decision to stop selling Opels in the UK and concentrate on the Vauxhall brand, and so DOT was disbanded. In 1975 he won the Avon Tour of Britain driving a privately entered Escort RS2000 - the Tour was a mixture of special stages and race circuits, and rally drivers tended to dominate.
He was very quickly approached by British Leyland to take on the  Triumph TR7. 1976 until 1978, saw him in the Triumph then in 1979 he championed a Talbot Sunbeam Lotus before returning to the TR7 in 1980, completing a number of outings for the British Leyland factory team.

Around 1979-1982 he also often visited South Africa on weekends to pilot the factory-entered Datsun Stanza, with navigator Richard Leeke, in the SA National Rally Championship as Datsun's (later Nissan SA) number 1 driver. In 1981 he won the Radio 5 Rally outright against stiff competition like Geoff Mortimer in a Chevrolet Chevair and Jan Hettema, a double-Springbok, in a Toyota Corolla.

1981 through to the end of 1984 had Pond competing with varying success in a varied selection of cars, including the Datsun Violet, Vauxhall Chevette HSR, Nissan Violet, Nissan 240RS and Rover SD1. For season 1985, Pond was recruited by the Austin Rover dealer team to drive the Group B MG Metro 6R4. Finishing third overall on the 6R4's international debut at the Lombard R.A.C. Rally, Pond, improving on his 4th place overall in the 1975 and 1978 events, gave the car its best-ever finish on a World Rally event. He stayed with the Austin Rover team until 1986 when the Group B formula was cancelled and the cars banned after a number of fatal accidents.

Pond mostly retired from Rallying at the end of 1986, however, he was retained on Austin Rover's books as a development driver, and was involved in the design and production of the MG F.

In 1988 Pond attempted to achieve the first-ever average 100 mph lap around the Isle of Man TT motorcycle race circuit in a standard-specification production Rover Vitesse, but was unsuccessful, largely due to wet weather on the mountain section of the course. For his second attempt on 6 June 1990 he again drove a demonstration lap using a standard production Rover 827 Vitesse, which became the first production car to average over 100 mph around the course. This feat stood until 2011, when Mark Higgins bettered the time and later improved on his own performances.

Throughout his life he was also a keen motorcyclist, riding fast road bikes and trials bikes successfully. 

Tony Pond succumbed to pancreatic cancer in 2002 and is survived by his wife, Nikki, and son, James.

Racing record

Complete IMC results

Complete WRC results

Complete British Saloon Car Championship results
(key) (Races in bold indicate pole position; races in italics indicate fastest lap.)

References

External links

Rallybase stat page

1945 births
2002 deaths
English rally drivers
British Touring Car Championship drivers
World Rally Championship drivers
Nismo drivers